Jamai Badal is a Bengali comedy Drama Film directed by Rabi Kinagi. This film was released on 18 January 2019 under the banner of Surinder Films. This is a remake of Punjabi movie Carry On Jatta which itself was loosely based on the 1989 movie Chakkikotha Chankaran.

Plot
This is the love story of Krish, son of Advocate Gourisankar Chakladar. Gourisankar has two sons, Harisankar and Krish. Harisankar is an advocate like his father but the younger son Krish is very casual in life, doesn't like working even though his father has given him a factory to handle. He wastes time with his friend Gunjan for fun. Gunjan has a girlfriend, Preeti. Krish and Gunjan travel together in seaside and there Krish meets Barsha and they fall in love. But Barsha has a condition that she will marry an orphan only which creates all the confusions and begins a chain of lies and laugh riots.

Cast
 Soham Chakraborty as Krish
 Koushani Mukherjee as Barsha
 Payel Sarkar as Preety
 Hiran as Gunjan
 Shantilal Mukherjee as Pronam Pal
 Bharat Kaul as Bholanath

Soundtrack

References

External links

2019 films
Films directed by Rabi Kinagi
Bengali remakes of Punjabi films
Indian romantic comedy films
Bengali-language Indian films
2010s Bengali-language films
Films scored by Jeet Ganguly
2019 romantic comedy films